Lee Williams was a Canadian rail worker.

Born around 1907 in Waco, Texas, Williams immigrated to Canada as a child, settling in Hillside, Saskatchewan with his family. He began working for the Canadian National Railway (CNR) as a sleeping-car porter in the 1930s. At the time opportunities for advancement among African-Canadian workers was limited: they faced discriminatory employment policies and had very low wages. Seeking to advocate for racial equality, Williams became chair of the local chapter of the Order of Sleeping Car Porters' Union and submitted a complaint to the federal government under the Fair Employment Practices Act. In April 1964, the government ruled in favour of the African-Canadian workers, ordering that CNR end its discriminatory practices.

As a result of the legal action, Williams became one of the first African-Canadian sleeping-car conductors and was later promoted to a supervisory position. He also served as president of the National Black Coalition of Canada. He retired in 1972.

Williams was awarded an honorary Doctor of Laws from York University in 2002. He was featured in the 1996 documentary The Road Taken.

References

Canadian National Railway people